The Agricultural Trade Development and Assistance Act of 1954 (enacted July 10, 1954) is a United States federal law that established Food for Peace, the primary and first permanent US organization for food assistance to foreign nations. The Act was signed into law on July 10, 1954, by President Dwight D. Eisenhower.

The act was popular in Congress because it allowed American farmers to sell their surplus commodities, fed hungry people, and developed future markets.

According to Eisenhower, the purpose of the legislation was to "lay the basis for a permanent expansion of our exports of agricultural products with lasting benefits to ourselves and peoples and peoples of other lands."

The act was first drafted by future Foreign Agricultural Service (FAS) Administrator Gwynn Garnett in 1950.  It is unusual in that it allows the FAS to conclude agreements with foreign governments without the advice or consent of the United States Senate.

References

External links
 Information about Food for Peace, from usaid.gov
 Information about U.S. agricultural legislation, from cornell.edu

1954 in law
United States federal agriculture legislation
83rd United States Congress
United States federal legislation articles without infoboxes